Mertens' water monitor (Varanus mertensi), also called commonly Mertens's water monitor, and often misspelled Mertin's water monitor, is a species of lizard in the family Varanidae. The species is endemic to northern Australia, and is a wide-ranging, actively foraging, opportunistic predator of aquatic and riparian habitats.  It is named after German herpetologist Robert Mertens.

Description
It is dark brown to black above, with many cream to yellow spots. The underparts are paler – white to yellowish – with grey mottling on the throat and blue-grey bars on the chest. The tail is strongly compressed laterally, with a high median dorsal keel, and is about 1.5 times the length of head and body.

Distribution and habitat
Mertens' water monitor is found in coastal and inland waters across much of northern Australia, from the Kimberley region of Western Australia, across the Top End of the Northern Territory and the Gulf Country, to the western side of the Cape York Peninsula in Far North Queensland.

Behaviour
Varanus mertensi is semiaquatic, a strong swimmer, and seldom far from water.  It is often seen basking on midstream rocks and logs, and on branches overhanging swamps, lagoons, and waterways throughout its range.  When disturbed, it drops into the water, where it can stay submerged for long periods.

Feeding
Mertens' water monitor feeds both on land and in the water, mainly on fish, frogs, and carrion, also taking terrestrial vertebrates and insects when available.  It has a good sense of smell and may dig up prey when foraging, including the eggs of freshwater turtles.

Breeding
Varanus mertensi lays eggs in a burrow, usually with egg-laying taking place early in the dry season and hatching in the following wet season. The eggs hatch within 200–300 days after laying, depending on temperature, with the hatchlings able to enter the water and swim immediately.

Conservation and status
Mertens’ water monitor is threatened by the spread of cane toads through its range, through poisoning after eating them.  Because of this V. mertensi is listed as Vulnerable under Northern Territory legislation.

Gallery

References

External links
 Monitor Lizards: Varanus mertensi (includes notes on keeping and breeding in captivity)

Varanus
Monitor lizards of Australia
Endemic fauna of Australia
Reptiles of Queensland
Reptiles of the Northern Territory
Reptiles of Western Australia
Taxa named by Ludwig Glauert
Reptiles described in 1951